is a Japanese professional baseball pitcher. He was born on October 10, 1987 in Toyonaka, Osaka. He is currently playing for the Hokkaido Nippon-Ham Fighters of the NPB.  He formerly played for the Hanshin Tigers, from 2007 to 2011.

References

1987 births
Living people
People from Toyonaka, Osaka
Baseball people from Osaka Prefecture
Japanese baseball players
Nippon Professional Baseball pitchers
Hanshin Tigers players
Hokkaido Nippon-Ham Fighters players